Clyth  is a remote scattered coastal crofting village, in eastern Caithness, Scottish Highlands and is in the Scottish council area of Highland.

Upper Clyth, Clyth Mains, Mid Clyth, Hill of Mid Clyth, West Clyth and East Clyth are all associated with Clyth.

In April 1855 disaster struck East Clyth. A boat manned by thirteen young men from the village aged from twelve to nineteen years was swamped in deep water, and they all drowned.

The Hill o' Many Stanes is at Mid Clyth. It has about 200 upright stones, set out in rows on the hillside. probably erected about 4,000 years ago.

References

Populated places in Caithness